Łupowo  is a village in the administrative district of Gmina Bogdaniec, within Gorzów County, Lubusz Voivodeship, in western Poland.

The village has a population of 840.

Notable residents
Hermann Teuchert (1880–1972), German historical linguist

References

Villages in Gorzów County